David Bremner Henderson (March 14, 1840 – February 25, 1906), a ten-term Republican congressman from Dubuque, Iowa, was the speaker of the United States House of Representatives from 1899 to 1903. He was the first congressman from west of the Mississippi River, the last Civil War veteran, the second foreign-born person (after Charles Frederick Crisp), and the only Iowan to serve as Speaker.

Early life

Henderson was born in Old Deer, Scotland on March 14, 1840. He emigrated to the United States with his parents, who settled in Winnebago County, Illinois in 1846.  The family moved to a farm near Clermont, in Fayette County, Iowa in 1849. He attended the common schools, and the Upper Iowa University at Fayette, Iowa.

Henderson married Augusta Fox, a fellow student at Upper Iowa University. While pursuing the same course of study they formed a lifelong attachment. After finishing their studies, their paths diverged for a time. Fox returned to her home and Henderson entered the army as a private. He was severely wounded and lost a leg, but he returned to active service and accepted a colonelcy even before fully recovering. After the close of the war Colonel Henderson and Fox were married. Fox was a native of Ohio, but had moved to Iowa at an early age. They had two daughters and one son. The elder daughter married Samuel Peaslee, and the other daughter, Isabelle, was an accomplished musician.

Civil War service
Henderson served in the Union Army during the Civil War and was wounded severely twice, once in the neck and later in the leg, which resulted in progressive amputations of that leg. He enlisted in the Union Army on September 15, 1861, as a private in Company C, 12th Iowa Volunteer Infantry Regiment.  Henderson was elected and commissioned first lieutenant of that company.  In the Battle of Fort Donelson, he was shot in the neck in the final charge over the breastworks.  After returning to the Regiment in April 1862, he lost one foot and part of one leg at the Second Battle of Corinth in October 1862.  He was discharged on February 26, 1863, due to his wounds, and returned to Iowa.  After serving as commissioner of the board of enrollment of the third district of Iowa from May 1863 to June 1864, he re-entered the Army as colonel of the new 46th Iowa Volunteer Infantry Regiment, one of the "Hundred Days Men" regiments, and commanded the Regiment until it was mustered out in September 1864.

Law practice
Henderson was a successful lawyer prior to pursuing his political career. After studying law, he was admitted to the bar in 1865 and commenced practice in Dubuque.  He was the collector of internal revenue for the third district of Iowa from November 1865 to June 1869, when he resigned to accept a position as Assistant U.S. Attorney for the Northern District of Iowa, where he served until 1871. He was in private practice in Dubuque until 1882.

Congressman and committee chair
In 1882, Henderson was elected as a Republican to represent Iowa's 3rd congressional district in the U.S. House, where he served from March 4, 1883, to March 3, 1903. He ran for Speaker of the House when the 51st Congress convened in 1889, finishing well behind Thomas Brackett Reed and runner-up William McKinley. He served as the chairman of the Committee on Militia in the 51st Congress, and chairman of the Committee on the Judiciary in the 54th and 55th congresses. He was also the ranking Republican on the House Committee on Appropriations during the 52nd and 53rd congresses, when the House had a Democratic majority. When Republicans regained the majority after the 1894 elections, Speaker Reed broke from tradition by returning the chairmanship to Joseph Gurney Cannon, who had served more nonconsecutive terms in the House and would have outranked Henderson had Cannon not lost his House seat for two years.

Henderson was an aggressive debater and an intense Republican partisan.  He seems to have loved a fight; he got into enough of them from his very first term, exercising his power of personal vituperation and abuse against Democrats whenever he found grounds to do so.  "I would rather spend an eternity in hell with a Confederate than an eternity in heaven with a northern Copperhead," he told one crowd. His secret for political success came from combining mainstream Republican causes with those dear to the hearts of his farmland constituency.  In the summer of 1886, he led House forces in favor of levying a high tax on oleomargarine. At the same time he sponsored a bill to raise the benefits for veterans' widows by fifty percent. (On the final passage of another bill he favored, increasing the pensions of disabled veterans, Henderson withheld his vote, since he would stand among the beneficiaries).  His commitment to pension legislation, general and individual, marked his whole career and took up most of his time. No member did more than he in that respect.

Speaker of the House

With the support of fellow "western state" Republicans, Henderson was elected to succeed Reed as Speaker following Reed's resignation from the post in 1899.  During his two terms as speaker (in the 56th and 57th congresses), Henderson, by longstanding tradition also held the role as chairman of the Committee on Rules.

On September 16, 1902 - with the next Congressional election less than two months away - Henderson surprised nearly everyone by announcing that he was withdrawing from the re-election campaign.  Several explanations for his abrupt withdrawal were suggested. Henderson's letter announcing his decision referred to "a growing sentiment, among Republicans, that I do not truly represent their views on the tariff question."  Some attributed his decision to the lingering effects of his war injuries. In a letter to Henderson's successor Joe Cannon dated three days after Henderson's announcement, former House Clerk Henry H. Smith stated that "there can be but one explanation of the reason for his action [the resignation] . . . they relate not alone to poker playing, but to his alleged intimacy with a certain `lobbyess' who is reported to have some written evidence that would greatly embarrass the Speaker. . . . He seemed to have lost all control of himself and become reckless. . . . This is not mere guesswork at all but private and reliable information which I am sure you will recognize when I tell you the name."  -  Whatever the cause, Henderson's resignation ushered in the beginning of Cannon's famous tenure as Speaker.

Death and honors
After leaving Congress, Henderson practiced law in New York City until health problems caused him to retire to Southern California.  Henderson died in Dubuque on February 25, 1906, aged 65. He is buried at Linwood Cemetery in Dubuque.

His portrait hangs in the speakers' room in the U.S. Capitol, and statues of Henderson by J. Massey Rhind are found in the collections of the Iowa State Historical Society and in Clermont.

"Allison-Henderson Park," in Dubuque, shares his name with that of six-term U.S. Senator William B. Allison, another citizen of Dubuque.

References

 Retrieved on 2008-10-01.

Further reading
Hoing, Willard L. “David B. Henderson: Speaker of the House.” Iowa Journal of History 55 (January 1957): 1-34.
Schlup, Leonard. “Defender of the Old Guard: David B. Henderson and Republican Politics in Gilded Age America.” Julien’s Journal 22 (January 1997): 22–24.
"100 Years Later, Henderson still remembered as a hero", Dubuque, Iowa Telegraph Herald, (February 25, 2006): 1.
"Red-Light District: Working the Intersection Of Sex and Power," Lily Burana, Washington Post, (May 6, 2007): Page B01.

1840 births
1906 deaths
American amputees
Iowa lawyers
Politicians from Dubuque, Iowa
People of Iowa in the American Civil War
American politicians with disabilities
Scottish emigrants to the United States
Speakers of the United States House of Representatives
Union Army colonels
Upper Iowa University alumni
Republican Party members of the United States House of Representatives from Iowa
19th-century American politicians